The Toyota RI4A/RI4AG is a prototype four-stroke 2.0-litre single-turbocharged inline-4 racing engine, developed and produced by Toyota, for the Super GT series and the Japanese Super Formula series. The RI4AG engine is fully custom-built.

Applications
Dallara SF14
Dallara SF19
Lexus RC-F GT500
Toyota GR Supra GT500

References

Engines by model
Gasoline engines by model
Toyota engines
Four-cylinder engines
Straight-four engines
Toyota in motorsport